One Piece Grand Collection is a social-network game by Namco Bandai. It has 1 million users.
Namco Bandai started work on the game with the goal of 10 Billion Yen in annual sales.
Gameplay revolves around collecting figurines and forming battle groups to defeat bosses.

References

Grand Collection
Bandai Namco games
2012 video games
Japan-exclusive video games
Mobile games
Video games developed in Japan